GSDS may refer to:

Golden Sun: Dark Dawn, a series of fantasy role-playing video games
Gold Stealing Detective Squad, a special unit of the Western Australian Police

See also
GSD (disambiguation)